The 5th Political Committee of the Workers' Party of Korea (WPK), officially the Standing Committee of the 5th Congress of the Workers' Party of Korea, was elected by the 1st Plenary Session of the 5th Central Committee on 12 November 1970.

Members

Candidates

Add-ons

References

Citations

Bibliography
Books:
 
 
  

Dissertations:
 

5th Political Committee of the Workers' Party of Korea
1970 establishments in North Korea
1980 disestablishments in North Korea